Robert E Blume (November 19, 1868 – September 16, 1937) was an American sailor serving in the United States Navy during the Spanish–American War who received the Medal of Honor for his actions.

Biography

He died September 16, 1937, and was buried at Arlington National Cemetery, Arlington, Virginia.

Stolen Medal of Honor
In 2003 an agent working for the Federal Bureau of Investigation was posing as a buyer when two people attempted to sell two Medals of Honor to him. One medal belonged to Blume and the other to United States Army First Sergeant George Washington Roosevelt who received his in actions during the American Civil War. Edward Fedora, a Canadian businessman, and his wife, Gisela, were charged with violating , Unlawful Sale of a Medal of Honor. Edward Fedora pleaded guilty and was sentenced to prison, but there is no record of what happened to Gisela.

Medal of Honor citation
Rank and organization: Seaman, U.S. Navy. Born: 19 November 1868, Pittsburgh, Pa. Accredited to: New Jersey. G.O. No.: 521, 7 July 1899.

Citation:

On board the U.S.S. Nashville during the cutting of the cable leading from Cienfuegos, Cuba, 11 May 1898. Facing the heavy fire of the enemy, Blume set an example of extraordinary bravery and coolness throughout this action.

See also

 List of Medal of Honor recipients for the Spanish–American War

References

External links
 
 Robert Blume at ArlingtonCemetery.net, an unofficial website

1868 births
1937 deaths
United States Navy Medal of Honor recipients
United States Navy sailors
Military personnel from Pittsburgh
American military personnel of the Spanish–American War
United States Navy personnel of World War I
Burials at Arlington National Cemetery
Spanish–American War recipients of the Medal of Honor